The following is a list of Michigan State Historic Sites in Branch County, Michigan. Sites marked with a dagger (†) are also listed on the National Register of Historic Places in Branch County, Michigan.


Current listings

See also
 National Register of Historic Places listings in Branch County, Michigan

Sources
 Historic Sites Online – Branch County. Michigan State Housing Developmental Authority. Accessed January 23, 2011.

References

Branch County
State Historic Sites
Tourist attractions in Branch County, Michigan